Lake Missoula was a prehistoric proglacial lake in western Montana that existed periodically at the end of the last ice age between 15,000 and 13,000 years ago.

The Glacial Lake Missoula National Natural Landmark is located about 110 kilometres (68 mi) northwest of Missoula, Montana, at the north end of the Camas Prairie Valley, just east of Montana Highway 382 and Macfarlane Ranch.

The lake was the result of an ice dam on the Clark Fork caused by the southern encroachment of a finger of the Cordilleran ice sheet into the Idaho Panhandle (at the present day location of Clark Fork, Idaho, at the east end of Lake Pend Oreille). The height of the ice dam typically approached , flooding the valleys of western Montana approximately  eastward.  It was the largest ice-dammed lake known to have occurred.

The periodic rupturing of the ice dam resulted in the Missoula Floods – cataclysmic floods that swept across eastern Washington and down the Columbia River Gorge approximately 40 times during a 2,000 year period. The cumulative effect of the floods was to excavate  of loess, sediment and basalt from the channeled scablands of eastern Washington and to transport it downstream. These floods are noteworthy for producing canyons and other large geologic features through cataclysms rather than through more typical gradual processes.

In addition, Middle and Early Pleistocene Missoula flood deposits have been documented to comprise parts of  the glaciofluvial deposits, informally known as the Hanford formation that are found in parts of the Othello Channels, Columbia River Gorge, Channeled Scabland, Quincy Basin, Pasco Basin, and the Walla Walla Valley. The age of these deposits is demonstrated by the presence of multiple interglacial calcretes interbedded in these glaciofluvial deposits, sequences of sediments with normal and reverse magnetostratigraphy, optically stimulated luminescence dating, and unconformity truncated clastic dikes. Based upon these criteria, Quaternary geologists estimated that the oldest of the Pleistocene Missoula floods happened before 1.5 million years ago. The older Pleistocene glaciofluvial deposits within the Hanford formation are fragmentary in nature because they have been repeatedly eroded and largely removed by subsequent Missoula floods. Because of the fragmentary nature of older glaciofluvial deposits, the exact number of older Missoula floods, which are known as Ancient Cataclysmic Floods, that occurred during the Pleistocene cannot be estimated with any confidence. Although Lake Missoula likely was the source of many of the Ancient Cataclysmic Floods, the fragmentary nature of the older deposits within the Hanford formation makes precise determination of the precise origin of the floods that deposited them very difficult.

Geology

Ice dam on the Clark Fork River
The Cordilleran ice sheet originating in British Columbia expanded out of the mountains and southward. A tongue of ice pushed down the Purcell Valley or Purcell Trench, reaching south beyond Lake Pend Oreille. This Purcell Lobe blocked the natural outlet of the Clark Fork River. Including its tributaries, Clark Fork represented western Montana's most important river system. The ice dam reached east up the Clark's Fork to Cabinet, Montana, and southward around the mountain to Bayview, Idaho on the south tip of Lake Pend Oreille in Farragut State Park.

Lake levels
The Clark Fork's drainage is a network of valleys among high mountain ranges. Lake Missoula formed through this region of western Montana. It is named for the city of Missoula in the upper reaches of the Clark Fork watershed. The mountains surrounding the city show the strandlines from the lake nearly 20,000 years ago. At its largest extent, Lake Missoula's depth exceeded  and may have held  of water, as much as Lake Erie and Lake Ontario combined.

The lake spread through the Clark Fork River basin, reaching east of Missoula,  to Gold Creek; northeast up the Blackfoot River  to Lake Alva;  and east of Ovando . Two large lobes formed to the south and north. To the south the Bitterroot Valley filled as far as Sula, Montana, .

The water was deep (average - ): maximum - ), dark and murky with sediment. There is no evidence of fish.  Scientists speculate that sediment known as rock flour created poor aquatic habitat. No evidence of large mammals, i.e.; mammoths, mastodons and bison may have roamed nearby, there is no evidence that these animals nor of human beings in the area.

Basins of Lake Missoula

Clark Fork Canyon
This reach follows Montana Route 200 up the Clark Fork River canyon,  to Paradise, then follows the Clark Fork, then  through the Paradise-St. Regis Canyon along Montana Highway 135. At St. Regis, the canyon opens out and continues to the east  with the river paralleled by Interstate 90 to as far as Ninemile, where it opens out into the Missoula basin. A western branch of this basin runs up the St. Regis River another  along with Interstate 90 to near Riverbend. 
Lookout Pass,  asl along Interstate 90
Thompson Falls – Located in the northern or western reach of the basin, the modern river passes through a layer of harder rock, forming a cascade.
 Nine Mile Rhythmites – Located at the eastern end of the basin, near Nine Mile. A light pink sand and silt deposited on the bottom of the lake. The silt deposits exist where the basin was wide, and when the lake drained, the area was not reached by the fast current of the water moving downstream. Each lay represents a period of still water behind the ice dam. The series reflects each period of still water with the intervening draining of the lake. As with "varves", darker layers are winter deposits, comprising fine particles in quiet water, and the lighter layers are coarser particles from the more active summer currents. Here, the number of layers represent 1,000 years of sediment.

Flathead Basin
The Flathead basin abutted the south face of the ice sheet. For most of this period, the glacial ice reached south to Polson, covering the entirety of Flathead Lake. The basin drains from the Polson Moraine at the south end of Flathead Lake, south to Ravalli, with a major lobe up the Little Bitterroot River and a minor basin on Camas Creek near Perma.  
 Little Money Creek Gulch Fill – Exit 96, north on US 93 to Ravalli. The coarse materials filled the side gulches on the narrow valley as Lake Missoula drained; eddy currents in tributary gulches deposited debris.
 Rainbow "Dog" Lake – Drains into the Clark Fork near Plains. During the existence of Lake Missoula, it was a drain for the Little Bitterroot basin when the lake level exceeded  asl and for the Camas Prairie basin when the lake level exceeded  asl. At the maximum depth of Lake Missoula, the valley was a  waterway. Rainbow Lake is thought to be a cataract retreat lake, formed by a  waterfall. The Clark Fork River dropped  near Plains, creating a  current through Boyer Creek. A weaker layer of rock beneath a more resistant layer was removed, causing the lip of the falls to retreat backward. Evidence is provided by the debris that lines the valley bottom.
 Camas Prairie Mega ripples – Camas Prairie is a small basin on Camas Creek, north of Perma. At the maximum water levels of the Hwy 382 through the prairie to information sign at mile marker13. Formed during the outflow of water during a break in the ice dam. The Camas Prairie Basin filled when Lake Missoula reached  asl. As the water in the Lake Missoula Basin rose, this basin gained a second outlet through Rainbow Lake at  asl; Willis Gulch  asl; Markle Pass  asl; and Big Gulch  asl.
 Markle Pass Kolks – Montana Highway 382 travels through Markle Pass between Camas Prairie and the Little Bitterroot Valley. The Kolks were carved out of the bedrock by strong underwater vortices created as Lake Missoula quickly drained during the great floods. When the tornado-like currents reached the bottom of the waterway, rocks were pulled out of the bottom surface. This debris can be found downstream towards Camas Prairie and Burgess Lake.

Missoula Basin
The basin extends from Missoula, west to Ninemile and up the Ninemile Creek valley. The basin is bordered by Rattlesnake Ridge on the north and Petty Mountain on the south(west). Features:  strandlines along the valleys east flank.  
 Glacial erratic on the grounds of the University of Montana
 Strandlines can be seen on the slopes of both Mount Jumbo ( asl) and Mount Sentinel ( asl), east in the Missoula Valley. These lines represent lake levels as the ice dam in the Purcell Trench failed and a lower lake level formed.
 Nine Mile Rhythmites on the bottom of the lake are visible.

Hamilton Basin
The basin extends from south of Conner to Lolo,  to the north.  The Bitterroot Mountains form the west shore and the Sapphire Mountains the east.

Blackfoot River Basin
The valleys of Potomac, Greenough, and Ovando-Helmville are linked by the Blackfoot River east of Missoula. A second reach, up the Clearwater River, joins the Blackfoot River at Clearwater. This basin joins the Clark Fork at Bonner. Upper valleys of the Clearwater-Blackfoot River basins run  from Seeley Lake, eastward to Browns Lake along Montana Route 83 and Montana Route 200.

Upper Clark Fork
Smaller reaches formed along the tributary valleys of Gold Creek,  up Flint Creek, forming an  basin, up Lower Willow Creek, and  up Rock Creek.

See also

References

External links
USGS Site on Glacial Lake Missoula
US Park Service Site for Glacial Lake Missoula National Natural Landmark
PBS's NOVA (TV series): Mystery of the Megaflood for information on the Missoula Floods
The Seattle Times' Pacific NW magazine - "Trailing an Apocalypse" - 30-Sep-2007
The Ice Age Floods Institute
U of Montana publication, The Montanan, "Sedimental Journey: Following the Path of Glacial Lake Missoula's Flood Waters."

Former lakes of the United States
Geology of Montana
Geology of Idaho
Natural history of Montana
Natural history of Idaho
National Natural Landmarks in Montana
Proglacial lakes
History of Missoula, Montana